Svetlovka is a rural locality (a village) in Mikhaylovsky Selsoviet, Bizhbulyaksky District, Bashkortostan, Russia. The population was 9 as of 2010. There is 1 street.

Geography 
Svetlovka is located 46 km north of Bizhbulyak (the district's administrative centre) by road. Brik-Alga is the nearest rural locality.

References 

Rural localities in Bizhbulyaksky District